The Great Game of Genocide: Imperialism, Nationalism, and the Destruction of the Ottoman Armenians is a 2005 non-fiction book by Donald Bloxham, published by Oxford University Press (OUP), about the Armenian genocide. Bloxham concludes that the Armenian genocide was planned by the Ottoman government.

It focuses on the geopolitical relations between the powers of World War I and the genocide, and how some countries supported the Armenians for geopolitical reasons but ended support due to new geopolitical factors in regards to the empire and the successor, the Republic of Turkey. The book includes an overview of relations between Ottoman Armenians and Ottoman Turks while many other works on the genocide focus solely on that.

The final chapter discusses how the government and people of the United States responded to the Armenian genocide.

Jay Winter said in his review that as Bloxham affirms the genocide, the "bitter irony of the title" is not a denial of the genocide.

References
  - First published online on 13 September 2006, issue published on 01 October 2006.

Notes

External links
 The Great Game of Genocide - Oxford University Press
 The Great Game of Genocide available online at Oxford Scholarship

2005 non-fiction books
History books about the Armenian genocide
Oxford University Press books